The 2018 Spielberg GP3 Series round was the third round of the 2018 GP3 Series. It was held on 30 June and 1 July 2018 at Red Bull Ring in Spielberg, Austria. The race supported the 2018 Austrian Grand Prix.

Classification

Qualifying

Feature race

Sprint race

Standings after the event 

Drivers' Championship standings

Teams' Championship standings

 Note: Only the top five positions are included for both sets of standings.

References

|- style="text-align:center"
|width="35%"|Previous race:
|width="30%"|GP3 Series2018 season
|width="40%"|Next race:

Spielberg
GP3
GP3 Spielberg
GP3 Spielberg